Dharmavaram is a city in Sri Sathya Sai District of the Andhra Pradesh state  of Indian country. It is mandal and divisional headquarters of Dharmavaram mandal and Dharmavaram revenue division respectively. The city is known for its handloom silk sarees.
The city is renowned for cotton, silk weaving industries and leather puppets. The city is called as Silk city of Andhra Pradesh. Dharmavaram is famous for weavers and it is fully populated by maximum weavers and by developing technology makes changes by producing various types of machine equipment emerging for weavers to weave quickly than the past decades and quality production was happening now and the production was famous for Sarees.

Etymology 
Dharmavaram tank was constructed by Kriyasakthi Odeyar. The name of the city was derived from the name of his mother, Dharmamba.

Geography
It has an average elevation of 345 metres (1131 feet).

Demographics

The average literacy rate stands at 71.07% with  literates, 44,055 male and 33,509 female, slightly lower than the national average of 73.00%.

Governance

Civic administration 

Dharmavaram Municipality was formed on 1 April 1964 as a Grade–III municipality. Each ward is represented by a ward member and the ward committee is headed by a chairperson. The present chairperson of the municipality is Beere Gopala Krishna and the commissioner is V. Mallikarjun.

Economy
Dharmavaram is a hub for pure silk sarees. The economy of the town is dependent on the weaving industry.
Farmers depend on rainwater due to lack of water resources.  A major crop in this area is ground nuts.

Transport

The Andhra Pradesh State Road Transport Corporation operates bus services from Dharmavaram bus station. Dharmavaram Junction railway station is a major railway station located on the Guntakal–Bangalore section and the Dharmavaram–Pakala branch line. There are two trains starting from this station to Vijayawada and Machilipatnam

Education

The primary and secondary school education is imparted by the government, aided and private schools School Education Department of the state. The medium of instruction followed by different schools are English, Telugu, Urdu.

See also 
 List of cities in Andhra Pradesh by population
 List of municipalities in Andhra Pradesh

References

Cities in Andhra Pradesh
Mandal headquarters in Sri Sathya Sai district
Cities and towns in Sri Sathya Sai district